Solmanskoye is a rural locality (a village) in Tonshalovskoye Rural Settlement, Cherepovetsky District, Vologda Oblast, Russia. The population was 104 as of 2002. There are 5 streets.

Geography 
Solmanskoye is located 9 km northeast of Cherepovets (the district's administrative centre) by road. Gorka is the nearest rural locality.

References 

Rural localities in Cherepovetsky District